Hixon is a civil parish in the Borough of Stafford, Staffordshire, England.  It contains seven listed buildings that are recorded in the National Heritage List for England. All the listed buildings are designated at Grade II, the lowest of the three grades, which is applied to "buildings of national importance and special interest".  
The parish includes the village of Hixon and the surrounding area.  The listed buildings consist of houses, farmhouses, a public house, a church, and an accommodation bridge over the Trent and Mersey Canal.


Buildings

References

Citations

Sources

Lists of listed buildings in Staffordshire